Lower Nossob is an extinct Khoisan language once spoken along the Nossob River on the border of South Africa and Botswana, near Namibia. It was closely related to the Taa language.

There are two attested dialects: ǀʼAuni (ǀʼAuo), recorded by Dorothea Bleek, and ǀHaasi, recorded by Robert Story.  ǀʼAuni is the word the former use for themselves; ǀʼAuo (or ǀʼAu) is what they call their language. ǀauni, ǁauni, Auni are misspellings.  Other renderings of the name ǀHaasi are Kʼuǀha꞉si, Kiǀhasi, and Kiǀhazi.

References

External links
 ǀʼAuni and ǀHaasi basic lexicon at the Global Lexicostatistical Database

Tuu languages
Extinct languages of Africa
Languages of South Africa
Languages of Botswana